The Yushchenko Government was created after the 1999 Ukrainian presidential election and forced the previous Cabinet of Valeriy Pustovoitenko to resign on November 30, 1999.

On December 22, 1999, 296 deputies voted for the appointment of Viktor Yushchenko, governor of the National Bank of Ukraine, as Prime Minister of Ukraine. His new government was Ukraine's ninth since Ukraine gained its independence in August 1991. The first ministerial appointments of the new government were announced on December 30, 1999.

On April 28, 2001, the Cabinet was dismissed due to the vote of no confidence resolution adopted by the Supreme Council of Ukraine.

Composition

References

External links

 
Ukrainian governments
1999 establishments in Ukraine
2001 disestablishments in Ukraine
Cabinets established in 1999
Cabinets disestablished in 2001
Viktor Yushchenko